Ballinacarriga Castle (Béal na Carraige in Irish, meaning Mouth of the Rock) is a 16th-century tower house located in the village of Ballinacarriga, about  from the town of Dunmanway and  from the village of Ballineen.
There is also a school nearby.

History 
Ballinacarriga was built in the sixteenth century by the native Ó Muirthile family. Following the 1641 rebellion, the family's lands were taken from them.

Architecture
The castle features several defensive features such as bartizans, and indications that the castle once featured both a machicolation and, unusually, a portcullis. The castle features a sheela na gig on the eastern side, roughly at the halfway point.

See also
List of castles in Ireland

References

Notes

Sources

External links
Irish Antiquities - Photographs of Ballinacarriga Castle and carvings

Castles in County Cork
National Monuments in County Cork